Udo Quellmalz (born 8 March 1967 in Leipzig) is a German judoka, who is nicknamed Quelle.

He won two Olympic medals in the half-lightweight (60–66 kg) division, in 1992 and 1996.

After he retired from competitive judo in 1998, Udo moved to Great Britain where he took the role of British Judo Performance Director. Since 2006 he has worked as head coach for the Austrian judo team and moved back to live in Germany. He is a sports science graduate from Leipzig University in Germany and is a qualified sports teacher.

External links
 
 profile with images
 Videos of Udo Quellmalz in action (judovision.org)

1967 births
Living people
German male judoka
Judoka at the 1988 Summer Olympics
Judoka at the 1992 Summer Olympics
Judoka at the 1996 Summer Olympics
Olympic judoka of East Germany
Olympic judoka of Germany
Olympic gold medalists for Germany
Olympic bronze medalists for Germany
Sportspeople from Leipzig
Olympic medalists in judo
World judo champions
Medalists at the 1996 Summer Olympics
Medalists at the 1992 Summer Olympics